William Rathbone V (17 June 1787 – 1 February 1868) was an English merchant and politician, serving as Lord Mayor of Liverpool.

Life

William Rathbone was a Quaker until he was disowned by the society of friends in 1820. He then joined the Unitarian Congregation at the Renshaw Street Chapel.   The Rathbones were prominent members of Liverpool society and were known as Merchants and Shipowners. 

The notability and prosperity of the Rathbone family of Liverpool was tied to the growth of that city as a major Atlantic trading port. William was the eldest son of William Rathbone IV and Hannah Mary (née Reynolds). He was born in 1787, although the statue of him in Sefton Park erroneously gives his birth year as 1788. William went into partnership as a merchant with his brother Richard.

William Rathbone was elected a Reformer (Liberal) councillor for the Pitt Street ward in Liverpool in the first ever Council election in 1835, subsequently re-elected in 1837, for the Vauxhall ward in 1845, Lord Mayor of Liverpool in 1837, and fought for social reforms. He supported Kitty Wilkinson in establishing wash-houses and public baths following the 1832 cholera epidemic, was an active supporter of the Municipal Reform Act 1835, was responsible for the distribution of New England Relief funds during the Irish famine of 1846-1847 (see British Relief Association).Rathbone is known as hiring the first district nurse who attended his ailing wife after this he contracted her to provide care in the community. With advice from Florence nightingale he established a nursing school at Liverpool which opened in 1862. Rathbone died on 1 February 1868 at Greenbank House, with over 1,000 mourners attending his funeral.

Family
Rathbone married Elizabeth (1790–1882), daughter of Samuel Greg of Quarry Bank Mill, Cheshire and Hannah (née Lightbody) in 1812. Their children included:

Elizabeth who married John Paget
Hannah Mary who married John Hamilton Thom 
William Rathbone VI
Samuel Greg 
Philip Henry (1828–95).

He was the great-grandfather of the actor Basil Rathbone.

Notes

External links
 University of Liverpool Rathbone Collection

1787 births
1868 deaths
Liberal Party (UK) councillors
Mayors of Liverpool
William